Liber Comicus is a lectionary from the Iberian Peninsula.

Liber comicus may also refer to:

 Liber comicus, in a more general sense, an early liturgical book of the Roman Rite